Jorge del Carmen Valenzuela Torres (23 August 1938 – 30 April 1963), popularly known as "El Chacal de Nahueltoro" (The Jackal of Nahueltoro), was a Chilean farmer who killed his partner and his five stepchildren in what the Investigations Police of Chile has called one of the most important crimes of twentieth century Chile. After spending almost 3 years in prison, he was sentenced to execution by firing squad, which was carried out in 1963. His execution sparked an important debate in Chilean society, questioning the legitimacy of the death penalty on a man who had shown regret and rehabilitation.

Biography 
Jorge Valenzuela was born in Cocharcas, a locality in San Carlos, to Melvina Torres Mella and Carlos Alberto Valenzuela Ortiz, who died in 1943. He left his home when he was only 7, after his mom remarried with one of his father's older sons from a previous marriage.

At one point Valenzuela had been living in a house assigned to Rosa Elena Rivas Acuña with her and her five children. The owners of the house eventually evicted them due to Valenzuela's reputation as an illiterate drunk.

On August 20, 1960, Valenzuela was waiting for Rivas in the ranch they had built for a home. He wanted her to bring him money from her widow's pension so that he could continue his drinking with it. When she returned without the money he flew into a rage and killed her with a scythe. Still in the drunken rage, he killed each of her children, stomping a 6-month-old baby to death in the process. After realizing what he had done, he fled the area, often using different names to prevent persecution.

After being arrested and imprisoned Valenzuela repented, became literate, became a stronger Catholic (with the guidance of the prison priest, Eloy Parra), and learned the trade of guitar-making. His eventual execution by firing squad was considered controversial as it went against the concept of rehabilitation, of which Valenzuela was considered a prime example.

The film El Chacal de Nahueltoro (1969) was based on Valenzuela's story and is considered by some to be the best Chilean film ever made.

See also
The Jackal of Pupunahue

References

1938 births
1963 deaths
Executed Chilean people
Executed mass murderers
Chilean mass murderers
Chilean people convicted of murder